Longhua County is a county in the northeast of Hebei province, China, bordering Inner Mongolia to the east. It is under the administration of Chengde City.

Administrative divisions
Towns:
Longhua Town, Hanmaying, Zhongguan, Qijia, Tangtougou, Zhangsanying, Tangsanying, Lanqi, Bugugou, Guojiatun

Townships:
Huangdi Township, Zhangjiying Township, Maojingba Township, Shanwan Township, Jianfang Township, Hanjiadian Township, Wangoumen Township, Yinjiaying Manchu Ethnic Township, Miaozigou Mongol and Manchu Ethnic Township, Pianpoying Manchu Ethnic Township, Badaying Mongol Ethnic Township, Taipingzhuang Manchu Ethnic Township, Jiutun Manchu Ethnic Township, Xi'achao Manchu and Mongol Ethnic Township, Baihugou Manchu and Mongol Ethnic Township

Climate

References

External links

 
County-level divisions of Hebei
Chengde